Hanshan County is a county in the east of Anhui Province, People's Republic of China under the jurisdiction of the prefecture-level city of Ma'anshan. The government of Hanshan County is located in Huanfeng Town.

Hanshan County has jurisdiction over eight towns.

Administrative divisions
Hanshan County has 8 towns.
8 Towns

Climate

Transportation
Hanshan South railway station is situated here.

References

County-level divisions of Anhui
Ma'anshan